Vladimir Belous (born July 29, 1993 in Kamensk-Shakhtinsky, Russia) is a chess Grandmaster from Moscow, Russia. He got International Master (IM) title in 2011 and Grandmaster (GM) title in 2013. He was the winner of 25th Annual Chicago Open in 2016 and US Masters Championship in 2017. In 2016, he moved to Brownsville TX, United States.

Notable Tournaments

References 

1993 births
Living people
Grandmasters for chess composition
Chess grandmasters
Russian chess players